NBC Studios are located in the historic 30 Rockefeller Plaza (on Sixth Avenue between 49th and 50th streets) in Manhattan, New York City. The building houses the NBC television network headquarters, its parent NBCUniversal, and NBC's flagship station WNBC (Channel 4), as well as cable news channel MSNBC.

The first NBC Radio City Studios began operating in the early 1930s. Tours of the studios began in 1933, suspended in 2014 and resumed on October 26, 2015. Because of the preponderance of radio studios, that section of the Rockefeller Center complex became known as Radio City (and gave its name to Radio City Music Hall).

Current studio spaces

Shows produced at NBC Studios New York

Among the shows originating at 30 Rockefeller Plaza (shows taping as of the 2020–2021 season in bold):
{| class="wikitable sortable"
|-
! Program
! Network/Station
! Dates
! Studio
|-
|The 11th Hour
| MSNBC
| 2016–present
|3A
|-
| 30 Rock
| NBC
| 2010 and 2012
| 8H (Live episodes)
|-
| All In with Chris Hayes
| MSNBC
| 2013–present
| 3K, 4E, 6A, 3A
|-
|Ayman
|MSNBC
|2021–present
|3C
|-
| The Amber Ruffin Show
| Peacock
| 2020–present
| 8G
|-
| Call My Bluff
| NBC
| 1965
| 6A
|-
| The Caroline Rhea Show
| Syndication
| 2002–2003
| 8G
|-
| Charge Account/Jan Murray Show
| NBC
| 1960–1962
| 6B
|-
| Concentration
| NBC
| 1958–1973
| 3A, 6A, 8G
|-
| Countdown with Keith Olbermann
| MSNBC
| 2007–2011
| 1A
|-
| The Crossover
| NBC Sports Network
| 2013–2014
| 8G
|-
|The Cycle
| MSNBC
|2012–2015
|3A, 3K
|-
| Dateline NBC
| NBC
| 1992–present
| 3A, 3B, 3K, 4E
|-
| The David Letterman Show
| NBC
| 1980
| 6A 
|-
|-
|Deadline: White House
|MSNBC
|2017–present
|4E, 3A
|-
| The Doctors
| NBC
| 1963–1982
| 3B, 3A
|-
| Dough Re Mi
| NBC
| 1958–1960
| 6A
|-
| Dr. Nancy
| MSNBC
| 2009
| 3A
|-
| The Dr. Oz Show
| Syndication
| 2009–2012
| 6A
|-
| E! News
| E!
| 2020
| 6E
|-
| Early Today
| NBC
| 2007–present
| 3K, 6E, 4E
|-
| The Ed Show
| MSNBC
| 2009–2015
| 3K, 3A
|-
| Football Night in America
| NBC
| 2006–2014
| 8G, 8H
|-
| He Said, She Said
| Syndication
| 1969-1970
|8H
|-
| House Party with Steve Doocy
| Syndication
| 1990
| 6A
|-
| How to Survive a Marriage
| NBC
| 1974–1975
| 8G
|-
| Howdy Doody
| NBC
| 1947–1960
| 3A,3H,3K,8G
|-
| Huntley-Brinkley Report
| NBC
| 1956–1970
| 6B,5HN,8G
|-
| Jackpot
| NBC
| 1974–1975
| 8G
|-
| The Jane Pauley Show
| Syndication
| 2004–2005
| 8G
|-
| Jeopardy!
| NBC
| 1964–1975
| 8G
|-
| The Kids Tonight Show
| Peacock
| 2021–present
| 6A
|-
| Last Call with Carson Daly
| NBC
| 2002–2005
| 8H
|-
| The Last Word with Lawrence O'Donnell
| MSNBC
| 2011–present
| 3K, 4E
|-
| Late Night(David Letterman and Conan O'Brien)
| NBC
| 1982–2009
| 6A
|-
| Late Night with Jimmy Fallon
| NBC
| 2009–2014
| 6B, 6A
|-
| Late Night with Seth Meyers
| NBC
| 2014–present
| 8G
|-
| Live at Five
| WNBC
| 1980–2007
| 6B
|-
| The Match Game
| NBC
| 1962–1969
| 8H
|-
| Maya & Marty
| NBC
| 2016
| 6A
|-
| Megyn Kelly Today
| NBC
| 2017–2018
|6A
|-
| The Meredith Vieira Show
| Syndication
| 2014–2016
| 6A
|-
|Top Story with Tom Llamas
|NBC News Now
|2021–present
|4E
|-
| Missing Links
| NBC
| 1963–1964
| 6A
|-
| Morning Joe
| MSNBC
| 2007–present
| 3A
|-
| Morning Meeting with Dylan Ratigan
| MSNBC
| 2009
| 3A
|-
| MSNBC Reports (Formerly MSNBC Live)
| MSNBC
| 2007–present
| 3A, 4E
|-
| NBC News at Sunrise
| NBC
| 1983–1999
| 3K
|-
| NBC Nightly News
| NBC
| 1970–present
| 8G, 3K, 3B, 3C, 1A
|-
| NBC Sports studio shows
| NBC
| 1947–2014
| 6A, 3K, 8G
|-
| News 4 New York
| WNBC
| 1941–present
| 3B, 6B, 7E, 3C, 3K
|-
| PDQ (New York shows)
| Syndication
| 1965–1969
| 8G
|-
| Personality
| NBC
| 1967–1969
| 6A
|-
| The Phil Donahue Show
| Syndication
| 1985–1996
| 8G
|-
| Play Your Hunch
| NBC
| 1959–1963
| 6B
|-
| Pop of the Morning
| E!
| 2020
| 6E
|-
| Reach for the Stars
| NBC
| 1967
| 6A
|-
| The Rachel Maddow Show
| MSNBC
| 2008–present
| 3A
|-
| Rock Center with Brian Williams
| NBC
| 2011–2013
| 3B
|-
| The Rosie O'Donnell Show
| Syndication
| 1996–2002
| 8G
|-
| Sale of the Century
| NBC, Syndication
| 1969–1974
| 8H
|-
| Saturday Night Live
| NBC
| 1975–present
| 8H
|-
| Say When!!
| NBC
| 1961–1965
| 6A
|-
| Shoot for the Stars
| NBC
| 1977
| 6A
|-
| Split Personality
| NBC
| 1959–1960
| 6A
|-
| That Was the Week That Was
| NBC
| 1963–1965
| 6A, 8H (live)
|-
| Tic Tac Dough
| NBC
| 1956–1959
| 8G, 6B
|-
| Today
| NBC
| 1952–present
| 3K, 8G, 6A, 3B, 1A
|-
| To Tell the Truth
| Syndication
| 1971–1978; 1980–1981
| 8G, 8H, 6A
|-
| The Tonight Show (Jack Paar and Johnny Carson)| NBC
| 1957–1972
| 6B
|-
| The Tonight Show Starring Jimmy Fallon| NBC
| 2014–present
| 6B, 6A
|-
| Treasure Hunt| NBC
| 1957–1959
| 8G
|-
| Twenty-One| NBC
| 1956–1958
| 6A, 6B
|-
| Up| MSNBC
| 2011–2013
| 3A
|-
| Verdict with Dan Abrams| MSNBC
| 2007–2008
| 3A
|-
| What's My Line?| Syndication
| 1971–1975
| 6A
|-
| The Who, What, or Where Game| NBC
| 1969–1974
| 6A, 8H
|-
| Way Too Early| MSNBC
| 2009–2016
| 3A
|-
| Word for Word| NBC
| 1963–1964
| 6A
|-
| You're Putting Me On| NBC
| 1969
| 6A
|}

Other locations
Some other New York originated programs are/were produced elsewhere in the area, including:
Ambassador Theatre, 215 West 49th Street. The theater returned to Broadway use in 1956.
Brooklyn Studios,Ticket for January 30, 1966 taping of The Sammy Davis Jr. Show, oldtvtickets.com. 1268 East 14th Street in Midwood, Brooklyn. Included two studios, used as the filming location of many 1950s color "Spectaculars" such as The Esther Williams Aqua Special, Peter Pan; it is also where The Perry Como Show (1955), Mitch Miller Show (1960s), The Sammy Davis Jr. Show (1960s), Hullabaloo (1965–1966), Kraft Music Hall, Tic Tac Dough (nighttime), The Cosby Show, and Another World were produced. It was the home of CBS's soap opera As the World Turns until the series ceased production in 2010. The studio was equipped for color production when it opened in 1954. In 2000, the facility was sold to JC Studios, which closed in 2014. In June 2015, the building was sold and converted to office and self storage spaces.
Center Theatre, 1236 Sixth Avenue. Productions included Texaco Star Theater with Milton Berle, Your Show of Shows (1950–1954), Voice of Firestone). The theater was demolished in 1954 for an addition to 1230 Avenue of the Americas.
Century Theater,Ticket for May 29, 1955 telecast of Mr. Peepers oldtvtickets.com. 932 Seventh Avenue at West 58th Street. Productions included Caesar's Hour with Sid Caesar (1954–1957), Mister Peepers, Treasure Hunt). Leased to Videotape Productions of New York 1958–1961. Demolished in 1962 for construction of an apartment building.
Colonial Theater,Tickets for February 21 and April 11, 1961 telecasts of The Price Is Right, oldtvtickets.com. 1887 Broadway at West 62nd Street. It was the taping location of the original version of The Price Is Right hosted by Bill Cullen, 1953–1963, and  Colgate Comedy Hour. The studio was the first equipped for color production and originated the first color telecast on November 3, 1953. Demolished in 1977.
Florida Showcase, second street-front location for The Today Show, 1962-1965.
Grumman Studios, Bethpage, New York. Located in the former Grumman Aircraft plant on Long Island. Since 2012, used by NBC for live musicals each December, including The Sound of Music Live, Peter Pan Live, and The Wiz Live.
Hudson Theatre,Ticket for October 23, 1957 telecast of Tonight Starring Jack  , oldtvtickets.com. 141 West 44th Street. The original home of Tonight hosted by Steve Allen (1954–1957)). The theater still stands as part of the Millennium Times Square New York hotel and returned to Broadway use in 2017.
International Theater, 5 Columbus Circle. The site of shows such as Admiral Broadway Review (1949), it was demolished in 1954 for the New York Coliseum. The Time Warner Center is now on the site.
New Amsterdam Roof Garden Theater, 214 West 42nd Street, converted in 1930. The rooftop theater is abandoned, but the main auditorium is used as a Broadway theater.
RCA Exhibition Hall. Original home of The Today Show, 1952-1958.
Ziegfeld Theatre,Ticket for August 13, 1958 telecast of Haggis Baggis, oldtvtickets.com. 1341 Sixth Avenue at West 54th Street. Shows included The Perry Como Show (from 1956), Concentration (primetime 1961)). It was demolished in 1966 for a 49-story office tower.
67th Street Studios, 101 West 67th Street. The Knickerbocker Beer Show aka The Steve Allen Show on WNBT-TV (1953-1954), the direct predecessor to Tonight Starring Steve Allen, originated from here. Also the site of The Home Show with Arlene Francis (1954-1957) and the primetime version of Concentration (1958). Built in 1949 as "9 Television Square" for WOR-TV, it was leased to NBC from 1953 to 1963. Between 1961 and 1968, it became the Videotape Center, owned by independent production company Videotape Productions of New York. The Reeves Lincoln Square Studios took over the space from 1968 to 1970. In 1970, it became ABC's Studios 18 and 19, the production facility for soap opera All My Children, and One Life to Live, until 1990. The building was demolished in 1995, and the site is now the 50-story Millennium Tower apartment building.
Uptown Studios (now Metropolis Studios), 105 East 106th Street at Park Avenue. The first episode of Howdy Doody in 1947 originated here.
NBC Universal Network Organization Center, 900 Sylvan Avenue (Route 9W), Englewood Cliffs, New Jersey, home of CNBC and CNBC World.
WNJU facility in Fort Lee, New Jersey; home of both Telemundo flagship WNJU and WNBC's New Jersey bureau, and former home of CNBC.
WNBC-TV's New York Live formerly (LX: NY'') was produced in Studio 51 at nearby 75 Rockefeller Plaza, then moved to Studio 3K.

References

External links

NBC Television Network
NBC Universal
NBC Tower

Television studios in the United States
Entertainment companies based in New York City
NBCUniversal